Dascyllus auripinnis is a damselfish from the Eastern Central Pacific. It occasionally makes its way into the aquarium trade. It grows to a size of 11.5 cm in length.

References

 

auripinnis
Fish described in 2001